Frida: A Biography of Frida Kahlo is a 1983 book by Hayden Herrera about the life of Mexican artist Frida Kahlo, her art, and her relationship with muralist Diego Rivera.

A major 2002 studio film, Frida, adapted from the book, stars Salma Hayek as Kahlo.

References

1983 non-fiction books
American biographies
Biographies about artists
Harper & Row books
Cultural depictions of Frida Kahlo
Biographies adapted into films